Asian Human Rights Development Organization is established in Pakistan under section 42 of The Companies Ordinance, 1984, It is generally accepted to be the first human rights organization registered with the federal government for nationwide operations. The Organization has been working in Pakistan since 1999.

Non-profit corporations
Human rights organisations based in Pakistan